Ovulariopsis papayae is a plant pathogen affecting papayas.

See also 
 List of papaya diseases

References

External links 
Index Fungorum
USDA ARS Fungal Database

Fungal tree pathogens and diseases
Papaya tree diseases
Leotiomycetes